The Telangana Legislative Assembly or Telangana Śāsana Sabha is the lower house of the Telangana Legislature. The Legislative Assembly of Telangana currently consists of 119 elected members and 1 nominated member from the Anglo-Indian community. Its chief engineer was Nawab Sarwar Jung.

The members of the Vidhana Sabha are directly elected by people through adult franchise.

Each constituency elects one member of the assembly. Members are popularly known as M.L.A.'s. The assembly is elected using the simple plurality or "first past the post" electoral system. The elections are conducted by the Election Commission of India.

The normal term of the members lasts for five years. In case of death, resignation or disqualification of a member, a by-election is conducted for constituency represented by the member. The house can be dissolved under the following conditions:

1. Failure to govern the state under the constitution

2. Inability of anyone to command majority support in the house for more than 1 month

3. Unopposed decision of cabinet to dissolve the house.

The person who commands majority support of house members becomes the Chief Minister, forms the cabinet and his party/coalition becomes the ruling party/coalition.

History 
After the official division of Telangana and Andhra Pradesh, the state would be a bicameral assembly with a legislative council and a legislative assembly.

The new state Telangana would be given 119 seats and its very first election would take place in April 2014. TRS had swept the election and formed the government with a super majority. With INC coming as the opposition and TDP as the 3rd largest. Then in 2018 the assembly dissolved earlier then expected and in the 2018 election TRS won with a greater majority.

Then in 2019 the assembly approved the addition of another MLA. And instead of being MLA this would be a nominated MLA by the ruling party from the Anglo-India community. Stephenos Elvis is the current nominated MLA from the BRS party.

Election Process 
There are currently 120 MLAs in the legislative assembly. Out of which 119 members are elected by the people and 1 is nominated from the Anglo-India community. The state is divided into 119 constituencies with roughly equal populations. Every 5 years the assembly is up for election. However election can happen earlier if :

1. Failure to govern the state under the constitution

2. Inability of anyone to command majority support in the house for more than 1 month

3. Unopposed decision of cabinet to dissolve the house.

Designations and present Members

List of Assemblies

Strength of parties in assembly

Members of Legislative Assembly

See also
 2018 Telangana Legislative Assembly election
Telangana Legislative Council
List of constituencies of Telangana Legislative Assembly

References

 
State lower houses in India